Pireh Yusefan (also Romanized as Pīreh Yūsefān; also known as Bareh Yūsofān, Baresfān, Barreh Yūsofān, Pereh Yūsofān, and Pirasuvar) is a village in Goyjah Bel Rural District, in the Central District of Ahar County, East Azerbaijan Province, Iran. At the 2006 census, its population was 186, in 35 families.

References 

Populated places in Ahar County